Sheikh Muhammad Tahir Rasheed, also known as Tahir Rashid, (born in Multan) (20 April 1954 – 3 June 2020) was a Pakistani politician who was affiliated with the Pakistan Muslim League. He was previously Member of National Assembly of Pakistan (MNA) (1993–1996, 1997–1999) and Member of Provincial Assembly (MPA) (1990–1993). He was also the Central Vice-President of the Pakistan Muslim League.

Family and education
He completed his initial education at Millat High School and then Government Emerson College in Multan and graduated from the University of Sindh, Jamshoro.

Tahir Rasheed hailed from a family that traces its roots to Jhajjar tehsil located in Rohtak district India. His grandfather, Sheikh Abdus Samad was assassinated while migrating to Pakistan at the time of the independence of Pakistan in 1947. Tahir Rasheed and his family represent a community which has large business and political interests in the urban politics of Multan city.

His father, Sheikh Muhammad Rasheed, was his political mentor; the former Member of Federal Parliament (Majlis-e-Shoora) in 1980s nominated by General Zia-ul-Haq and elected Member of National Assembly of Pakistan (MNA), when elections were held on a non-party basis for the term 1985–1988.

Tahir Rasheed was married and has three sons, one daughter. The eldest son Muhammad Ahmad Tahir is currently studying abroad. His two other sons are Muhammad Ahsan Yousaf Tahir and Muhammad Asad Ali Asghar, who are currently studying in Multan.

Political career
An agriculturist by profession turned to politics in 1987 as an elected councillor of Municipal Corporation Multan. He rose through the political ranks, being elected as a Member of Provincial Assembly (MPA) for the term of 1990–1993. He was elected to National Assembly of Pakistan serving two consecutive terms, the first from 1993 to 1996 and the second from February 1997 to October 1999.

1990–1993
In 1990, he contested his first election for the post of Member of Provincial Assembly. He was given a ticket for constituency PP-163 in the remote area of Multan where he was an outsider and his opponent was Makhdoom Hassan Raza. Tahir Rasheed managed to win the seat by a margin of 7,000 votes. For three years he served as an MPA but when Nawaz Sharif resigned along with President Ghulam Ishaq Khan in 1993, assemblies were dissolved and new elections were scheduled.

1993
In November 1993, the new President Farooq Leghari called for fresh elections. Tahir Rasheed was once again issued a ticket from Multan but this time, it was for National Assembly of Pakistan from constituency NA-116 where his opponent was Syed Tanveer-ul Hassan Gillani, a Former Federal Minister who is also a cousin of Ex Prime Minister Makhdoom Syed Yousaf Raza Gilani. He was elected MNA on IJI ticket in 1990. In 1993, when the PML-N awarded ticket to Tahir Rasheed, Gilani opted for the PPP ticket.

1997–1999
In 1997, new elections were called for again. Tahir Rasheed was given Pakistan Muslim League ticket to contest the elections, from the same constituency NA-116. Again he was up against Syed Tanveer-ul-Hassan Gilani, who is a close relative of Ex Prime Minister Syed Yousaf Raza Gilani and PML-N's Javed Hashmi. However, Tahir Rasheed once again managed to defeat former federal ministers.

During this time, Sheikh Tahir Rasheed became a member of Parliamentary Steering Committee (PSC). The PSC was created in response to UNDP's assistance to enhance the professional capacity of the parliamentarians and National Assembly Secretariat and to support other democratic processes. He was one of the members of parliament who was also interested in assistance regarding relations between the Parliament and the media and in making television coverage of Parliament more effective.

In 1998, Sheikh Tahir Rasheed was one of the foremost supporters of the decision taken by the government to develop nuclear weapons.

2002–2004
Tahir Rasheed did not participate in the general elections held in 2002, choosing to run instead for Zila Nazim of Multan District in a by election held in 2003.

2005
Tahir Rasheed was one of the few people in the PML N who was trying to convince the senior leadership of the PML N to stop supporting the PPP in the ARD as he believed the PPP was not sincere with PML-N and had been taking an advantage of the PML-N to achieve their own objectives and capture the PML-N vote bank.

In August 2005, he decided to join the Pakistan Muslim League due to differences with the party policies and because his supporters were finding it difficult to adjust with the PPP in the ARD.

Tahir Rasheed was followed by Ex-Punjab Food Minister Hafiz Iqbal Khakwani, Ex-MNA Syed Javed Ali Shah, sitting MPA Syed Mujahid Ali Shah, PML-N Ex-MPA Khalid Khokhar and the son of Ex-MPA Sheikh Amir Khalil to join PML.

2008 elections
Tahir Rasheed lost.

2011

Breakaway from PML-Q
On 4 May 2011, Sheikh Muhammad Tahir Rasheed announced his separation from Pakistan Muslim League.

2012 by-elections 
On 25 February 2012, Sheikh Muhammad Tahir Rasheed 's younger brother Sheikh Muhammad Tariq Rasheed was elected as an MNA from NA-149. This seat was vacated by Javed Hashmi who has joined Pakistan Tehreek-e-Insaf (PTI) led by Imran Khan.

References

|-

External links 
 Tahir Rasheed's brother Tariq Rasheed sweeps NA 149 by poll
 PML-N’s Tariq Rasheed defeated PPP’s Malik Liaquat Dogar after a good fight
 PML-N’s Tariq Rashid, brother of former MNA Tahir Rashid contesting from NA 149 Multan
 PPP, PML-N men ‘share’ Multan
 Dawn Pakistani Newspaper
 Dawn Newspaper PML-Q, PPP united for Multan Nazim’s election- FORMER PML-N Javed Ali Shah announced support for Pir Riaz instead of his party comrade Tahir Rasheed
 Dawn Newspaper Multan Nazim election today: Feudals, bureaucracy bet on same horse
 Pak Spectator
 Election Commission Of Pakistan
 1995 Human Rights Report: PAKISTAN
 UNDP-PAK/97/010-Support to Parliamentary and Democratic Processes in Pakistan
 PAKISTAN TELEVISION CORPORATION LIMITED
 Dawn Pakistani Newspaper
 Provincial Assembly of the Punjab 11th Assembly (1990–1993)
 Official Website of National Assembly of Pakistan
 PML-Q rally protests Israeli attack on Gaza
 THE NEWS

Punjabi people
Pakistan Muslim League (N) politicians
2020 deaths
Politicians from Multan
1954 births
Government Emerson College alumni
University of Sindh alumni